The 2015–16 season is Eibar's 2nd season in La Liga and 75th season in professional football. Eibar was reinstated to the first division even though they finished 18th and subsequently relegated during the 2014–15 season, due to Elche's administrative relegation by the Liga de Fútbol Profesional (LFP).

Season
Thanks to their 2014 promotion and subsequent stay in La Liga, the club was able to expand the sitting of their stadium with the approval of the Eibar City Council. The addition of approximately 1,200 seats to the new North End raised the capacity to 6,267 of the stadium. For the new season, Eibar changed kits supplier from Hummel to Puma along with a new shirt sponsorship deal with Swiss oil company AVIA International.

On 18 July 2015, Eibar played its 75th Anniversary game against Scottish club Celtic in Ipurua (1–4). This included an inaugural ceremony on the pitch with a parade of 19th century clothed basque soldiers with a Saltire and bagpipes playing Scotland the Brave, with officials from both clubs shooting a 350 kg 19th century cannon. Eibar stated that they invited Celtic as their opponent for the game due to the strong connection between the Basque Country and Scotland, and also due to the Scottish presence in Eibar through the years (the main supporter group is named "Eskozia la Brava", meaning "Scotland the Brave").

After their opening weekend victory over Granada at Los Carmenes, Eibar lead La Liga's league table for the first time in their 75 years history. On 26 August, Eibar made official the transfer of Japanese international Takashi Inui from Bundesliga club Eintracht Frankfurt. The reported fee of 0.3 million euros is the most expensive transfer in Eibar's history. In response to the 2015 European migrant crisis, Eibar released a statement appealing to different government agencies, including the European Union, Government of Spain and Basque Government to find humanitarian  solutions to this crisis. Eibar also pledged to donate 5 euros to the United Nations High Commissioner for Refugees (UNHCR) for every ticket sold to their home match against Atlético Madrid.

Squad

Team statistics
{|cellpadding="4" cellspacing="0" border="1" style="text-align: center; font-size: 85%; border: gray solid 1px; border-collapse: collapse; "
|- style="background:#8B0000; color:white;"
! rowspan="2"| Number
! rowspan="2"| Position
! rowspan="2"| Name
! rowspan="2"| Age
! rowspan="2"| Since
! colspan="5"| La Liga
! colspan="5"| Copa del Rey
! rowspan="2"| Signed from
! rowspan="2"| Notes
|- style="background:#8B0000; color:white;"
! Apps
! Mins
! 
! 
! 
! Apps
! Mins
! 
! 
! 
|-
! colspan="17" style="background:#dcdcdc; text-align:center;"| Goalkeepers
|-
|1
|GK
|align="left"| Xabi Irureta
|
|2009

|4
|360
|0
|0
|0

|4
|540
|0
|2
|0
|align="left"|Real Unión
|
|- bgcolor="#EFEFEF"
|13
|GK
|align="left"| Asier Riesgo
|
|2015

|34
|3060
|0
|1
|0

|0
|0
|0
|0
|0
|align="left"|Osasuna
|
|-
|25
|GK
|align="left"| Jaime Jimenez
|
|2014

|0
|0
|0
|0
|0

|0
|0
|0
|0
|0
|align="left"|Real Valladolid
|
|-
! colspan="17" style="background:#dcdcdc; text-align:center;"| Defenders
|-
|2
|CB
|align="left"| Ion Ansotegi
|
|2016

|8
|542
|0
|0
|0

|0
|0
|0
|0
|0
|align="left"|Real Sociedad
|
|- bgcolor="#EFEFEF"
|3
|CB
|align="left"| Aleksandar Pantić
|
|2015

|20
|1677
|0
|6
|0

|3
|206
|0
|0
|0
|align="left"|Villarreal (on loan)
|
|-
|4
|CB
|align="left"| Iván Ramis
|
|2015

|23
|1794
|0
|8
|1

|2
|154
|0
|1
|0
|align="left"|Levante
|
|- bgcolor="#EFEFEF"
|15
|CB
|align="left"| Mauro dos Santos
|
|2015

|31
|2682
|0
|7
|0

|2
|180
|0
|1
|0
|align="left"|Almería
|
|-
|16
|FB
|align="left"| Lillo
|
|2013

|10
|549
|0
|5
|1

|3
|170
|0
|1
|0
|align="left"|Alcoyano
|
|- bgcolor="#EFEFEF"
|17
|LB
|align="left"| David Juncà
|
|2015

|31
|2335
|0
|8
|0

|2
|163
|0
|0
|0
|align="left"|Girona
|
|-
|19
|LB
|align="left"| Antonio Luna
|
|2015

|15
|1001
|0
|2
|0

|3
|197
|0
|2
|0
|align="left"| Aston Villa
|
|- bgcolor="#EFEFEF"
|23
|CB
|align="left"| Borja Ekiza
|
|2014

|4
|188
|0
|1
|0

|3
|270
|0
|0
|0
|align="left"|Athletic Bilbao
|
|-
|33
|CB
|align="left"| Imanol Corral
|
|2016

|1
|1
|0
|0
|0

|0
|0
|0
|0
|0
|align="left"|Youth system
|
|-
! colspan="17" style="background:#dcdcdc; text-align:center;"| Midfielders
|-
|5
|MF
|align="left"| Gonzalo Escalante
|
|2015

|34
|2829
|3
|15
|0

|2
|160
|0
|0
|1
|align="left"| Catania
|
|- bgcolor="#EFEFEF"
|6
|DM
|align="left"| Josip Radošević
|
|2016

|8
|405
|0
|2
|1

|0
|0
|0
|0
|0
|align="left"| Napoli (on loan)
|
|-
|7
|MF
|align="left"| Ander Capa (vice-captain)
|
|2012

|36
|3122
|2
|12
|0

|1
|90
|0
|0
|0
|align="left"|Youth system
|
|- bgcolor="#EFEFEF"
|8
|AM
|align="left"| Takashi Inui
|
|2015

|27
|1627
|3
|1
|0

|2
|135
|0
|0
|0
|align="left"| Eintracht Frankfurt
|
|-
|11
|MF
|align="left"| Izet Hajrović
|
|2015

|7
|174
|0
|0
|0

|2
|172
|1
|0
|1
|align="left"| Werder Bremen (on loan)
| 
|- bgcolor="#EFEFEF"
|14
|MF
|align="left"| Dani García (captain)
|
|2014

|35
|3056
|0
|15
|0

|0
|0
|0
|0
|0
|align="left"|Real Sociedad
|
|-
|20
|MF
|align="left"| Keko Gontán
|
|2015

|29
|2315
|3
|5
|1

|3
|145
|0
|0
|0
|align="left"|Albacete
|
|- bgcolor="#EFEFEF"
|22
|AM
|align="left"| Jota
|
|2016

|13
|689
|0
|1
|0

|0
|0
|0
|0
|0
|align="left"| Brentford (on loan)
|
|-
|24
|MF
|align="left"| Adrián González
|
|2015

|32
|2230
|5
|6
|0

|4
|305
|0
|0
|0
|align="left"|Elche
|
|- bgcolor="#EFEFEF"
|28
|MF
|align="left"| Iñigo Barrenetxea
|
|2015

|1
|2
|0
|0
|0

|2
|135
|0
|0
|0
|align="left"|Youth system
|
|-
|29
|MF
|align="left"| Asier Etxaburu
|
|2015

|0
|0
|0
|0
|0

|1
|46
|0
|0
|0
|align="left"|Youth system
|
|-
! colspan="17" style="background:#dcdcdc; text-align:center;"| Forwards
|-
|9
|FW
|align="left"| Sergi Enrich
|
|2015

|38
|2420
|9
|4
|0

|3
|162
|2
|0
|0
|align="left"|Numancia
|
|- bgcolor="#EFEFEF"
|18
|FW
|align="left"| Borja Bastón
|
|2015

|36
|2577
|18
|3
|0

|3
|180
|1
|1
|0
|align="left"|Atlético Madrid (on loan)
|
|-
|21
|FW
|align="left"| Saúl Berjón
|
|2014

|29
|1400
|4
|1
|0

|2
|180
|1
|0
|0
|align="left"|Real Murcia
|
|-
! colspan="17" style="background:#dcdcdc; text-align:center;"| Departed during season
|-
|–
|CF
|align="left"| Mikel Arruabarrena
|
|2009

|6
|56
|1
|0
|0

|2
|180
|1
|0
|0
|align="left"| Legia Warsaw
|
|- bgcolor="#EFEFEF"
|–
|AM
|align="left"| Eddy Israfilov
|
|2015

|6
|207
|0
|2
|0

|3
|170
|0
|1
|0
|align="left"|Real Murcia (on loan)
|
|-
|–
|FW
|align="left"| Simone Verdi
|
|2015

|9
|290
|0
|2
|0

|4
|315
|1
|0
|0
|align="left"| Milan (on loan)
|

From youth squad

Technical staff
{|cellpadding="4" cellspacing="0" border="1" style="text-align: center; font-size: 85%; border: gray solid 1px; border-collapse: collapse;"
|-
! style="background:#8B0000; color:white; text-align:center;"| Position
! style="background:#8B0000; color:white; text-align:center;"| Name
|-
|align="left"|First team head coach || align="left"|José Luis Mendilibar
|- bgcolor="#EFEFEF"
|align="left"|Assistant coach || align="left"|Iñaki Bea
|-
|style="text-align: left;" rowspan="2"|Fitness coach || align="left"|Toni Ruiz
|-
|align="left"|Alain Gandiaga
|- bgcolor="#EFEFEF"
|align="left"|Goalkeeping coach || align="left"|Josu Anuzita
|-
|style="text-align: left;" rowspan="2"|Physiotherapist || align="left"|Manu Sánchez
|-
|align="left"|Unai Ormazabal
|- bgcolor="#EFEFEF"
|align="left"|Doctor || align="left"|Ostaiska Egia
|-
|align="left"|Team liaison || align="left"|German Andueza

Transfers

Out

In

Competitions

Overall

Record

Friendlies

Kickoff times are in CET.

Primera División

League table

Results summary

Result round by round

Matches
Kickoff times are in CET and CEST.

Results overview

Copa del Rey

Kickoff times are in CET and CEST.

References

External links

SD Eibar
SD Eibar seasons